Bargo railway station is located on the Main South line in New South Wales, Australia. It serves the town of Bargo, opening on 13 July 1919 as West Bargo at the same time as a new alignment between Picton and Mittagong. It was renamed Bargo on 1 November 1921.

Platforms & services
Bargo has two side platforms. It is serviced by NSW TrainLink Southern Highlands Line services travelling between Campbelltown and Moss Vale with 2 weekend morning services to Sydney Central and limited evening services to Goulburn.

Transport links
Picton Buslines operate two routes via Bargo station:
911: to Buxton & Picton
912: Yanderra to Picton

Berrima Buslines operate one route that serves Bargo station:
806: to Mittagong

References

External links

Railpage Locations Database – Bargo Railway Station
Bargo station details Transport for New South Wales

Railway stations in Australia opened in 1919
Regional railway stations in New South Wales
Short-platform railway stations in New South Wales, 2 cars
Main Southern railway line, New South Wales